The 2013–14 Luxembourg Cup was the 89th season of Luxembourg's annual football cup competition. It began on 1 September 2013 with Round 1 and ended on 23 May 2014 with the final. The winner of the competition would qualify for the first qualifying round of the 2014–15 UEFA Europa League. Jeunesse Esch are the defending champions, having won their thirteenth cup title last season.

Calendar

Round 1
34 teams from the 2. Division (IV) and 3. Division (V) entered in this round. The games were played on 1 September 2012.

Bye: FC 47 Bastendorf, Red Boys Aspelt, US Moutfort/Medingen, SC Ell, FC Koerich/Simmern, FC Brouch, AS Luxemburg/Porto, Claravallis Clervaux, US Rambrouch, Minière Lasauvage, Les Ardoisiers Perlé, FC Schengen, Excelsior Grevels, Etoile Sportive Schouweiler, US Reisdorf

Round 2
The seventeen winners of Round 1 and the fifteen other teams from the 2. Division (IV) and 3. Division (V) competed in this round. The games were played on 15 September 2013.

Round 3
The sixteen winners of Round 2 competed in this round, as well as twenty-eight teams from Division 1 (III), which enter the competition in this round. The games were played on 6 October 2013.

Round 4
The twenty-two winners of Round 3 competed in this round, as well as fourteen teams from Division of Honour (II), which enter the competition in this round. The games were played on 27 October 2013.

Round 5
The eighteen winners of Round 4 compete in this round, as well as the fourteen teams from the National Division (I), which enter the competition in this round. The games are played on 1 December 2013.

Round 6
The sixteen winners of Round 5 competed in this round. The games were played on 8 December 2013.

Quarterfinals
The eight winners from Round 6 competed in the quarterfinals. They were held on 1 March 2014.

Semifinals
The four winners from quarterfinals competed in the semifinals. They were held on 7 and 8 May 2014.

Final

References

External links
 Official page 
 Private homepage about everything regarding Luxembourg soccer 

Luxembourg Cup seasons
Luxembourg Cup
Cup